Jamshēd or Jamshīd (Kurdish: Cemşîd), also spelled as Jamshed, Jamshid, Jamshaid, Jamsheed, Cemşid, Jamshet, or Jamset, is a Persian masculine given name. It is a common name in Iran, Central Asia and among Muslims and Parsis of South Asia. It may refer to the following:

Given name
 Jamshed (reigned 1342–1344), second Sultan of Kashmir
Jamshid, Iranian mythical king
Jamshid Amouzegar, Iranian politician
Jamshed Ansari, Pakistani film actor
Jamshed Anwar, Pakistani footballer
Jamshid Behnam, Iranian writer
Jamshed Bharucha, Indian-American educator
Jamshed Dasti, Member of the National Assembly of Pakistan
Jamshid Delshad, Iranian-American politician
Jamshyd Godrej, billionaire Indian industrialist
Jamshid Giunashvili, Georgian linguist, Iranologist, researcher, author and diplomat 
Jamsetjee Jejeebhoy, Indian merchant and philanthropist
Jamshid Kashani, Iranian medieval mathematician
Jamshid Karimov,  Uzbek journalist
Jamshid Maharramov, Azerbaijani footballer
Jamshid Momtaz, Iranian academic
Jamshid Nakhchivanski, Imperial Russian, Azerbaijani, and Soviet military commander
Jamshid Nassiri, Iranian footballer
Jamshid Sharmahd, Iranian-German journalist
Jamsetji Tata, Indian industrial pioneer
Jamshid bin Abdullah of Zanzibar, Sultan of Zanzibar
Junaid Jamshed, Pakistani singer
Nasir Jamshed, Pakistani cricketer
Sam Hormusji Framji Jamshedji Manekshaw (1914 – 2008), Field Marshal of the Indian Army

See also
 Jamshid Nakhchivanski Military Lyceum
 Jamshed Town, Karachi, Sindh, Pakistan
 Jamshedpur, India

Notes

Persian masculine given names
Pakistani masculine given names